The Petite Sauldre is a  long river of France. Near Salbris, it joins with the Grande Sauldre, to form the Sauldre.

Communes 
The river passes through the following communes.

 Cher 
 Parassy, Henrichemont, Menetou-Salon, Achères, Ivoy-le-Pré, La Chapelle-d'Angillon, Ennordres, Ménétréol-sur-Sauldre

 Loir-et-Cher 
 Souesmes, Salbris

References 

Rivers of Centre-Val de Loire
Rivers of Cher (department)
Rivers of France